A tourniquet is a device that is used to apply pressure to a limb or extremity in order to stop the flow of blood. It may be used in emergencies, in surgery, or in post-operative rehabilitation.

A simple tourniquet can be made from a stick and a rope, but the use of makeshift tourniquets has been reduced over time due to their ineffectiveness compared to a commercial and professional tourniquet. This may stem the flow of blood, but side effects such as soft tissue damage and nerve damage may occur.

Types 
There are three types of tourniquets: surgical tourniquets, emergency tourniquets, and rehabilitation tourniquets.

Surgical tourniquets 

Silicone ring tourniquets, or elastic ring tourniquets, are self-contained mechanical devices that do not require any electricity, wires or tubes. The tourniquet comes in a variety of sizes. To determine the correct product size, the patient's limb circumference at the desired occlusion location should be measured, as well as their blood pressure to determine the best model. Once the correct model is selected, typically two sterile medical personnel will be needed to apply the device. Unlike with the pneumatic tourniquet, the silicone ring tourniquet should be applied after the drapes have been placed on the patient. This is due to the device being completely sterile. The majority of the devices require a two-man operation (with the exception of the extra large model):

 One person is responsible for holding the patient's limb, the other will place the device on the limb (with the extra-large there are two people needed).
 Application:
 Place the elastic ring tourniquet on the hand/foot. Take care to ensure that all the fingers/toes are enclosed within the device.
 The handles of the tourniquet should be positioned medial-lateral on the upper extremity or posterior-anterior on the lower extremity.
 The person applying the device should start rolling the device while the individual responsible for the limb should hold the limb straight and maintain axial traction.
 Once the desired occlusion location is reached, the straps can be cut off or tied just below the ring.
 A window can be cut or the section of stockinet can be completely removed.
 Once the surgery is completed the device is cut off with a supplied cutting card.

The elastic ring tourniquet follows similar recommendations noted for pneumatic tourniquet use:
 It should not be used on a patient's limb for more than 120 minutes.
 The tourniquet should not be placed on the ulnar/peroneal nerve.
 The silicone ring device cannot be used on patients with blood problems such as DVT, edema, etc.
 A patient suffering from skin lesions or a malignancy should use this type of tourniquet.

In knee replacement 
The current body of evidence suggests if a tourniquet is used in knee replacement surgery, it probably increases the risk of severe side effects and postoperative pain. The evidence did not show any clear benefit on patient function, treatment success, or quality of life.

Emergency tourniquets

Silicone ring auto-transfusion tourniquet 

The silicone ring auto-transfusion tourniquet (SRT/ATT/EED), or surgical auto-transfusion tourniquet (HemaClear), is a simple to use, self-contained, mechanical tourniquet that consists of a silicone ring, stockinet, and pull straps that results in the limb being exsanguinated and occluded within seconds of application. The tourniquet can be used for limb procedures in the operating room, or in emergency medicine as a means to stabilize a patient until further treatment can be applied.

Combat application tourniquet 

The combat application tourniquet (CAT) was developed by Ted Westmoreland. It is used by the U.S. and coalition militaries to provide soldiers a small and effective tourniquet in field combat situations. It is also used in the UK by NHS ambulance services, along with some UK fire and rescue services. The unit utilizes a windlass with a locking mechanism and can be self-applied. The CAT has been adopted by military and emergency personnel around the world.

History 

During Alexander the Great’s military campaigns in the fourth century BC, tourniquets were used to stanch the bleeding of wounded soldiers. Romans used them to control bleeding, especially during amputations. These tourniquets were narrow straps made of bronze, using only leather for comfort.

In 1718, French surgeon Jean Louis Petit developed a screw device for occluding blood flow in surgical sites. Before this invention, the tourniquet was a simple garrot, tightened by twisting a rod (thus its name tourniquet, from tourner = to turn).

In 1785 Sir Gilbert Blane advocated that, in battle, each Royal Navy sailor should carry a tourniquet:

It frequently happens that men bleed to death before assistance can be procured, or lose so much blood as not to be able to go through an operation. In order to prevent this, it has been proposed, and on some occasions practised, to make each man carry about him a garter, or piece of rope yarn, in order to bind up a limb in case of profuse bleeding. If it be objected, that this, from its solemnity may be apt to intimidate common men, officers at least should make use of some precaution, especially as many of them, and those of the highest rank, are stationed on the quarter deck, which is one of the most exposed situations, and far removed from the cockpit, where the surgeon and his assistants are placed. This was the cause of the death of my friend Captain Bayne, of the Alfred, who having had his knee so shattered with round shot that it was necessary to amputate the limb, expired under the operation, in consequence of the weakness induced by loss of blood in carrying him so far. As the Admiral on these occasions allowed me the honour of being at his side, I carried in my pocket several tourniquets of a simple construction, in case that accidents to any person on the quarter deck should have required their use.

In the 2000s, the silicon ring tourniquet, or elastic ring tourniquet, was developed by Noam Gavriely, a professor of medicine and former emergency physician. The tourniquet consists of an elastic ring made of silicone, stockinet, and pull straps made from ribbon that are used to roll the device onto the limb. The silicone ring tourniquet exsanguinates the blood from the limb while the device is being rolled on, and then occludes the limb once the desired occlusion location is reached. Unlike the historical mechanical tourniquets, the device reduces the risk of nerve paralysis. The surgical tourniquet version of the device is completely sterile, and provides improved surgical accessibility due to its narrow profile that results in a larger surgical field. It has been found to be a safe alternative method for most orthopedic limb procedures, but it does not completely replace the use of contemporary tourniquet devices. More recently the silicone ring tourniquet has been used in the fields of emergency medicine and vascular procedures.

After World War II, the US military reduced use of the tourniquet because the time between application and reaching medical attention was so long that the damage from stopped circulation was worse than that from blood loss.
Since the beginning of the 21st century, US authorities have resuscitated its use in both military and non-military situations because treatment delays have been dramatically reduced. The Virginia State Police and police departments in Dallas, Philadelphia and other major cities provide tourniquets and other advanced bandages. In Afghanistan and Iraq, only 2 percent of soldiers with severe bleeding died compared with 7 percent in the Vietnam War, in part because of the combination of tourniquets and rapid access to doctors. Between 2005 and 2011, tourniquets saved 2,000 American lives from the wars in Iraq and Afghanistan. In civilian use, emerging practices include transporting tourniquetted patients even before emergency responders arrive and including tourniquets with defibrillators for emergency use.

See also 
 Intravenous regional anesthesia
 Emergency bleeding control
 Emergency tourniquet
 Battlefield medicine
 Tourniquet test
 Hair tourniquet
 Ischemia-reperfusion injury of the appendicular musculoskeletal system
 Vascular occlusion training

References

External links 

 
 

Bleeding
Medical equipment

it:Laccio emostatico